Betta cracens is a species of gourami endemic to the island of Sumatra in Indonesia. It is an inhabitant of freshwater swamp forest. The Latin term cracens means "slender" or "elegant" and is so named because of the fish's slender body. It was first described in 1996 by Heok Hui Tan and Peter K. L. Ng in The Raffles Bulletin of Zoology.

The Betta Cracens have a Labyrinth Organ, a morpho‐physiological adaptation that allows them to respirate in air. The Labyrinth Organ is a folded suprabranchial accessory breathing organ and a defining characteristic of fish in the suborder Anabantoidei. It is formed by vascularized expansion of the epibranchial bone of the first gill arch. This adaptation allows these fish to thrive in their harsh habitats.

References

cracens
Taxa named by Heok Hui Tan
Taxa named by Ng Peter Kee Lin
Fish described in 1996